Shirin Aumeeruddy-Cziffra (born in Great Britain) is a Mauritian lawyer, politician and diplomat. She is the head of the Public Bodies Appeal Tribunal (PBAT), which settles disputes of civil servants and local communities in matters related to recruitment and sanctions since 2009. She was Minister of Women’s Rights and Family Affairs from 1982 to 1983, and became the Mayor of Beau Bassin-Rose Hill in 1987. She was Ombudsman for protection of children's rights from 2004 to 2011. She was the first Muslim woman to be elected as a member of the National Assembly and in a ministerial position in mauritius.

Biography 

Her native language is Mauritian Creole, while she speaks English and French. Aumeeruddy-Cziffra completed her law degree from the Inns of Court School of Law in Great Britain.

She was a women's activist in her early years and started Ligue Féministe in 1974, Solidarité Femmes in Mauritius in 1977. Along with 19 other women, she fought against  the Immigration and Deportation Acts, which prevented spouses of foreign officials from seeking resident status. The case was argued with two set of victims, namely married women and single women espoused by the foreign officials. The court initially accepted only the case of married women. She eventually won the case in 1981.

From 1982 to 1983, she was Minister of Women’s Rights and Family Affairs. She was the first Muslim woman to be elected as MP and to serve a ministerial position. During the same years, she served as Ambassador to UNESCO, Member of Parliament in Rose-Hill, and Attorney General for the Government of Mauritius.

She became the Mayor of Beau Bassin-Rose Hill in 1987.

Between 1992 and 1995, Aumeeruddy-Cziffra served as the Ambassador of Mauritius to Paris, Rome, Madrid and Lisbon.

In September 2000, she became a Chairperson (Chairman) for Mauritius Broadcasting Corporation (MBC).

She also served as Minister of Justice of Mauritius, President of the Permanent Council of the Francophonie and the International Organization of the Francophonie (OIF), Board member of the Agency of the Francophonie, Board of Directors Member of the Institute for Human Rights & Development (Gambia), Board Member of NGO Femme Africa Solidarité, and founding member of NGO Women in Law and Development in Africa.

She held the position of Ombudsman for protection of children rights from 2004 to 2011. In March 2011, she asked the government to adopt the optional protocol to facilitate collaboration between Mauritius and other countries on the war against sexual child abuse. In 2012, she became head of the Public Bodies Appeal Tribunal (PBAT), which settles disputes of civil servants and local communities in matters related to recruitments and sanctions. In 2015, her mandate was renewed for three more years. In March 2018, the PBAT's governance was reshuffled, and Shirin Aumeeruddy-Cziffra's mandate was once again renewed.

Awards 

 2004: Honorary doctorate from the University of Paris Panthéon-Sorbonne for introducing a faculty of law to Mauritius and service overall.
 2006: Tombouctou Award for her peace initiatives in Africa with FAS.
 14 July 2015: Chevalier of the Legion of Honour by France’s Minister of Foreign Affairs. She is married to a teacher and the pair have two children.

References

Members of the National Assembly (Mauritius)
Year of birth missing (living people)
Living people
Mauritian Muslims
Mauritian Militant Movement politicians
Mauritian people of Indian descent
People from Plaines Wilhems District
Mauritian women diplomats
Permanent Delegates of Mauritius to UNESCO
Ambassadors of Mauritius to France
Ambassadors of Mauritius to Italy
Ambassadors of Mauritius to Spain
Ambassadors of Mauritius to Portugal
Justice ministers of Mauritius
Women's ministers of Mauritius
Foreign Ministers of Mauritius
Female foreign ministers
Women government ministers of Mauritius
Place of birth missing (living people)
20th-century women politicians
21st-century women politicians
Women ambassadors